Financial News is a London-based newspaper.

Financial News may also refer to:
The Financial News, South Korean newspaper
Financial News (1884–1945), defunct British newspaper
, Chinese newspaper